Lavaca School District (or Lavaca Public Schools) is a public school district based in Lavaca, Arkansas, United States. The school district encompasses  of land in Sebastian County, Arkansas. The district includes Lavaca, Central City, and a section of Barling.

Established in 1915, the district proves comprehensive education for pre-kindergarten through grade 12 is accredited by the Arkansas Department of Education (ADE).

Schools 
 Lavaca High School, serving more than 250 students in grades 9 through 12.
 Lavaca Middle School, serving more than 250 students in grades 5 through 8.
 Lavaca Elementary School, serving more than 350 students in pre-kindergarten and 4.
 In 2012, the school received a Silver Award  in the HealthierUS School Challenge that recognizes excellence in nutrition and physical activity by the Food and Nutrition Service of the U.S. Department of Agriculture.

References

External links 
 

School districts in Arkansas
Education in Sebastian County, Arkansas
School districts established in 1915
1915 establishments in Arkansas